Salammbô may refer to:
Salammbo (Carthage), the name of the ancient children's cemetery (tophet) of Carthage
Salammbô (1862), the original novel by Gustave Flaubert (and name given by Flaubert to the character of the youngest daughter of Hamilcar Barca)
Salammbô (Mussorgsky), an unfinished opera, based on Flaubert's novel, on which Modest Mussorgsky worked between 1863 and 1866
Salammbô (Reyer) (1890), an opera composed by Ernest Reyer based on Flaubert's novel
Salammbô (Rachmaninoff) a projected opera by Sergei Rachmaninoff
Salammbo, a 1925 film by Alexander Kolowrat
Salammbo, a 1940 opera by Veselin Stoyanov
The Loves of Salammbo, a film directed by Sergio Grieco 
Salammbo: Battle for Carthage, a video game